Medical Arts Building may refer to:

Canada
 Medical Arts Building (Montreal)

United States
(by state then city/town)
 Medical Arts Building (Hot Springs, Arkansas), listed on the National Register of Historic Places (NRHP)
 Medical Arts Building (Atlanta, Georgia), NRHP-listed
 Medical Arts Building (Grand Rapids, Michigan), listed on the NRHP in Kent County, Michigan
 Medical Arts Building (Oak Park, Illinois)
 Medical Arts Building (Oklahoma City, Oklahoma), listed on the NRHP in Oklahoma County
 Medical Arts Building (Portland, Oregon), NRHP-listed
 Medical Arts Building (Pittsburgh, Pennsylvania) at the University of Pittsburgh Medical Center
 Medical Arts Building (Reading, Pennsylvania)
 Medical Arts Building (Chattanooga, Tennessee), listed on the NRHP in Hamilton County, Tennessee
 Medical Arts Building (Knoxville, Tennessee), NRHP-listed
 Medical Arts Building and Garage, Memphis, Tennessee, listed on the NRHP in Shelby County, Tennessee
 Medical Arts Building (Fort Worth, Texas), one of the former tallest buildings in Fort Worth
 Medical Arts Building (Galveston, Texas), a 1929-built contemporary of City National Bank (Galveston, Texas)
 Medical Arts Building (San Antonio), also known as "Old Medical Arts Building", a contributing building in the Alamo Plaza Historic District
 Medical Arts Building (Newport News, Virginia), NRHP-listed
 Rhodes Medical Arts Building, Tacoma, Washington, listed on the NRHP in Pierce County, Washington

See also
 Doctors Building (disambiguation)